Siguiri Airport  is an airport serving Siguiri, a river port in western Guinea.

See also
Transport in Guinea
List of airports in Guinea

References

External links
OpenStreetMap - Siguiri
OurAirports - Guinea
Siguiri - FallingRain

Google Earth

Airports in Guinea